Nagia vadoni is a species of moth in the family Erebidae. It is found on Madagascar.

References

Nagia
Moths described in 1968
Moths of Africa